The Last Journey of Ninoy is a 2009 Philippine documentary film directed by Jun Reyes that premiered on August 21, 2009, in commemoration of Ninoy Aquino Day and on August 23 at ABS-CBN. The film includes the final interview given by Aquino's wife who then became the first woman to Philippine presidency, Corazon Aquino. It was produced by Unitel Productions, Inc. and the Benigno Aquino Jr. Foundation.

Synopsis
It is about the story of the final days of Aquino from August 12, 1983, to August 21 till he was assassinated at Manila International Airport. It features interviews and commentaries from Aquino's wife and former Philippine president, Corazon Aquino.

Cast
Bam Aquino as  Ninoy Aquino
Pia Millado as Cory Aquino

Release and reception
The film premiered on August 21, 2009, at the Powerplant Mall in Makati. On August 23, the film premiered in national television simultaneously via ABS-CBN and also simulcasted on the ABS-CBN News Channel (ANC) and The Filipino Channel (TFC).
Since August 21, 2020, the film is streaming on ABS-CBN's streaming service iWant (later renamed as iWant TFC due to  the service's merger with TFC Online).

Critical response
Reviews for the documentary film were generally positive. Rose Feliciano of the ABS-CBN News wrote "I was touched and I cried at the end of the film!" and "As I am! This film must be shown to all students nationwide...and to the public in general .....again and again! It truly inspires!"

Accolades
The film was a finalist in the 2010 Al Jazeera International Documentary Film Festival and in the 2010 New York Film Festival.

References

External links
Film from Unitel Productions, Inc.'s website

2009 films
Philippine documentary films
ABS-CBN television specials
2009 in Philippine television
Documentary films about politicians
2009 documentary films
Filipino-language films
Cultural depictions of Benigno Aquino Jr.
Cultural depictions of Corazon Aquino
2000s English-language films